Web Compatibility Test for Mobile Browsers (often Mobile Acid test) is a test page published and promoted by the World Wide Web Consortium (W3C) to expose web page rendering flaws in mobile web browsers and other applications that render HTML. It was developed in the spirit of the Acid test by the Web Standards Project and test the relevant parts that mobile browser need to support. The test uses for some parts JavaScript to test the different technologies. The browser have to accomplish 16 different subtest indicated by a 4 X 4 raster of squares.

Overview of standards tested
The mobile Acid test tests a variety of web standards published by the World Wide Web Consortium and the Internet Engineering Task Force.
Specifically, the mobile Acid test tests:

 Subtest 1. CSS2 min-width
 Subtest 2. Transparent PNG
 Subtest 3. gzip support: A method for compression the transferred web page. It is part of the http 1.1 specification.
 Subtest 4. HTTPS: A method to broadcast the web page in a secure way.
 Subtest 5. Cookies support: The web page is able to store data in small text files on the mobile.
 Subtest 6. iframe including of XHTML-served-as-XML content
 Subtest 7. XMLHttpRequest
 Subtest 8. Static SVG (gzipped)
 Subtest 9. CSS Media Queries
 Subtest 10. JavaScript framework
 Subtest 11. Dynamic SVG
 Subtest 12. IRIs and IDN
 Subtest 13. DOM 'mutation' events
 Subtest 14. The canvas element
 Subtest 15. contenteditable
 Subtest 16. CSS3 selectors

See also
 Comparison of layout engines

References

External links
The Web Compatibility Test for Mobile Browsers
The Web Compatibility Test for Mobile Browsers – a black-green version of the test
official explanation of the test
MWI Blog – first announcement
MWI blog – update
Mobile Website Design
Many Pictures On Flickr
a blog entry
a w3c gallery

Web design
World Wide Web Consortium
Acid tests
Computer-related introductions in 2008
Web software
Mobile content